Michele Fawdon (1947–2011) was an English-born Australian actress and singer. She is known for her roles in TV serials Matlock Police (1971–1974), The Unisexers (1975) and A Country Practice (1980, 1985, 1992). In 1979 she won the Australian Film Institute Award for Best Actress in a Leading Role for Cathy's Child (1979) and Australian Film Institute Award for Best Lead Actress for a Telefeature for The Fish Are Safe (1986) in 1987. She died of an unspecified cancer.

Biography 

Michele Fawdon was born on 15 December 1947 in Harrow, London, as the oldest of three children of Yvonne and John Fawdon, a pilot for BOAC. She had polio as a child and took ballet lessons to strengthen her leg. Some of Fawdon's childhood was spent based in Hong Kong and Singapore. From the age of 12 she attended a theatrical boarding school in Sussex and completed an examination by London Academy of Music and Dramatic Art. The Fawdons emigrated to Sydney in August 1964. She studied at the Ensemble Theatre for three years.

Fawdon's first television role was an appearance in the fourth episode of the drama series, You Can't See 'Round Corners, which was broadcast from July 1967. In August of that year she took the role of Deanne in the comedy play, All Things Bright and Beautiful, at Ensemble Theatre. The Australian Jewish Times reviewer felt her performance was "outstanding" showing "certainty was matched by most of the other characters." She took the role of Elizabeth Green, a miner's wife, in the musical feature film, Stockade (December 1971), which is set in the era of the Eureka Stockade. From March to May of that year she acted in the play of the same name at the Independent Theatre.

The artist's breakthrough musical theatre role was as Mary Magdalene in the original Australian stage production of Jesus Christ Superstar from March to May 1972, which toured to Adelaide, West Melbourne, Launceston, Brisbane and Haymarket. According to Patricia Morgan of The Australian Women's Weekly, Fawdon is "a green-eyed blonde, aged 24. She is 5ft. 3in. [= ], ideally proportioned, and of pearl-cream complexion. In short, she's a stunner. She is also a singing actress who hasn't been out of work one day since she arrived from England." W. L. Hoffmann of The Canberra Times caught the premiere in Adelaide, "Fawdon was an
appealing and musically excellent Mary Magdalene." She was recorded for the soundtrack album, Jesus Christ Superstar (Original Australian Cast Recording) (late 1972). In the following year Fawdon was replaced as Magdalene by Marcia Hines.

Fawdon's various television roles were in Matlock Police (1971, 1972, 1973, 1974), The Unisexers (1975), The Sullivans (1979), Cop Shop (1979, 1980), Young Ramsay (1980), and A Country Practice (1980, 1985, 1992). In the drama feature film, Cathy's Child (1979), she performed the theme song. For the role, the actress met and spoke with the Maltese-born, Australian resident Cathy Baikas, whom she portrays. She then "mixed with the Maltese community, working for a while in a clothing factory to get the feeling of the accent and the day-to-day concerns."

In 1986 she portrayed Lena Ranger in the ABC-TV telemovie, The Fish Are Safe, which was directed by Noni Hazelhurst. For the role of Lena, Fawdon won the Australian Film Institute Award for Best Lead Actress for a Telefeature in 1987. In 1990 Fawdon appeared as Rose Peterson in the New Zealand film, The Rogue Stallion. She played Judge Cath in four episodes of Marshall Law (2002). Her last screen appearance was as Lorna Shanks in three episodes of Killing Time (2011).

Fawdon met her domestic partner, Geoff Jenkins, when both appeared in Manning Clark's History of Australia: The Musical in 1988. They had a child together in 1995. Michele Fawdon died on 23 May 2011, from cancer, aged 63.

Filmography

References

External links

 

1947 births
2011 deaths
Australian film actresses
Australian television actresses
Best Actress AACTA Award winners